Nikolayevka is a rural locality (a selo) in Diyashevsky Selsoviet, Bakalinsky District, Bashkortostan, Russia. The population was 15 as of 2010. There is 1 street.

Geography 
Nikolayevka is located 35 km southeast of Bakaly (the district's administrative centre) by road.

References 

Rural localities in Bakalinsky District